Tekirdağ Çorlu Airport  is a military and public airport in Çorlu, a town in Tekirdağ Province, Turkey.

Airlines and destinations

Statistics

References

External links

 

Airports in Turkey
Buildings and structures in Tekirdağ Province
Çorlu District
Transport in Tekirdağ Province
Things named after Mustafa Kemal Atatürk